This is a list of Canadian films released in 2019:

Films

See also
 2019 in Canada
 2019 in Canadian television

Notes

References

External links
Feature Films Released In 2019 With Country of Origin Canada at IMDb

2019

Canada